Pınarhisar, ancient Brysis (Βρύσις in Ancient Greek), is a large town and district of Kırklareli Province in the Marmara region of Turkey. The mayor is İhsan Talay (AKP). The population is 10,463 as of 2010.

The town was a part of the defensive line Lüleburgaz - Karaağaç - Bunarhisar during the First Balkan War. The former spelling of its name was Bunarhisar. The settlement was captured by Bulgarians in the First Balkan War but was taken back by the Ottoman Empire in the course of the Second Balkan War.

History 
According to Turkish government resources, Pınarhisar was founded during the reign of Theodosius II, by  c. 425, under the name "Brysis" meaning "spring" in Greek. The town's fortress was built during the Byzantine era. In 1190, the town was significantly damaged by Crusader occupation. It was attacked by Tatars in 1264.

The town was captured by the Ottomans in 1368, by the forces under the command of Ghazi Mihal, as a part of a campaign led by Murad I.

Christian bishopric 
The first mention of the archdiocese of Brysis is in an early 10th-century Notitia Episcopatuum associated with Emperor Leo VI the Wise. Extant documents record the names of three of its ancient archbishops: John took part in the Second Council of Nicaea in 787; Nicetas was at the Photian Council of Constantinople (879) dell'879; Leo was one of the signatories of a decree of Patriarch Alexius of Constantinople in 1027.

During the Fourth Crusade Brysis became a Latin Church archbishopric under the name Verissa (of Thrace).

No longer a residential bishopric, Brysis is today listed by the Catholic Church as a titular see.

References

Sources
 

 
Districts of Kırklareli Province